San José Villa is a town and municipality in Catamarca Province in northwestern Argentina. To the north it continues into the La Loma neighbourhood.

References

Populated places in Catamarca Province